In Modern English, you is the second-person pronoun. It is grammatically plural, and was historically used only for the dative case, but in most modern dialects is used for all cases and numbers.

History 
You comes from the Proto-Germanic demonstrative base *juz-, *iwwiz from Proto-Indo-European *yu- (second-person plural pronoun). Old English had singular, dual, and plural second-person pronouns. The dual form was lost by the twelfth century, and the singular form was lost by the early 1600s. The development is shown in the following table.

Early Modern English distinguished between the plural  and the singular . As in many other European languages, English at the time had a T–V distinction, which made the plural forms more respectful and deferential; they were used to address strangers and social superiors. This distinction ultimately led to familiar thou becoming obsolete in modern English, although it persists in some English dialects.

Yourself had developed by the early 14th century, with the plural yourselves attested from 1520.

Morphology 
In Standard Modern English, you has five shapes representing six distinct word forms:
 you: the nominative (subjective) and accusative (objective or oblique case) forms
 your: the dependent genitive (possessive) form
 yours: independent genitive (possessive) form
 yourselves: the plural reflexive form
 yourself: the singular reflexive form

Plural forms from other varieties
Although there is some dialectal retention of the original plural ye and the original singular thou, most English-speaking groups have lost the original forms. Because of the loss of the original singular-plural distinction, many English dialects belonging to this group have innovated new plural forms of the second person pronoun. Examples of such pronouns sometimes seen and heard include:
 y'all, or you all – southern United States, African-American Vernacular English, the Abaco Islands, St. Helena and Tristan da Cunha. Y'all however, is also occasionally used for the second-person singular in the North American varieties.
  [ju gajz~juɣajz] – United States, particularly in the Midwest, Northeast, South Florida and West Coast; Canada, Australia. Gendered usage varies; for mixed groups, "you guys" is nearly always used. For groups consisting of only women, forms like "you girls" or "you gals" might appear instead, though "you guys" is sometimes used for a group of only women as well.
  – United Kingdom, Palmerston Island, Australia
 you mob – Australia
 , all-you – Caribbean English, Saba
 a(ll)-yo-dis – Guyana
 allyuh – Trinidad and Tobago
 among(st)-you – Carriacou, Grenada, Guyana, Utila
  – Barbados
 yinna – Bahamas
 /oona –  Jamaica, Belize, Cayman Islands, Barbados, San Salvador Island
  – Ireland, Tyneside, Merseyside, Central Scotland, Australia, Falkland Islands, New Zealand, Philadelphia, parts of the midwest, Cape Breton and rural Canada
 yous(e) guys – in the United States, particularly in New York City region, Philadelphia, Northeastern Pennsylvania, and the Upper Peninsula of Michigan;
 you-uns, or yinz – Western Pennsylvania, the Ozarks, the Appalachians
 ye,  – Ireland, Tyneside, Newfoundland and Labrador

Semantics 
You prototypically refers to the addressee along with zero or more other persons, excluding the speaker. You is also used to refer to personified things (e.g., why won't you start? addressed to a car). You is always definite even when it is not specific.

Semantically, you is both singular and plural, though syntactically it is always plural: it always takes a verb form that originally marked the word as plural, (i.e. you are, in common with we are and they are).

Third person usage

You is used to refer to an indeterminate person, as a more common alternative to the very formal indefinite pronoun one. Though this may be semantically third person, for agreement purposes, you is always second person.
Example: "One should drink water frequently" or "You should drink water frequently".

Syntax

Agreement 
You always triggers plural verb agreement, even when it is semantically singular.

Functions 
You can appear as a subject, object, determiner or predicative complement. The reflexive form also appears as an adjunct. You occasionally appears as a modifier in a noun phrase.
 Subject: You're there; your being there; you paid for yourself to be there.
 Object: I saw you; I introduced her to you; You saw yourself.
 Predicative complement: The only person there was you.
 Dependent determiner: I met your friend.
 Independent determiner: This is yours.
 Adjunct: You did it yourself.
 Modifier: (no known examples)

Dependents 
Pronouns rarely take dependents, but it is possible for you to have many of the same kind of dependents as other noun phrases.
 Relative clause modifier: you who believe
 Determiner: the real you; *the you
 Adjective phrase modifier: the real you; *real you
 Adverb phrase external modifier: Not even you

Pronunciation 
According to the Oxford English Dictionary, the following pronunciations are used:

See also
 Generic you
 English personal pronouns
 Thou
 Y'all
 Yinz

References

Modern English personal pronouns
Second-person plural pronouns in English
English pronouns
English words